Ina Rosenberg Garten (born February 2, 1948) is an American author, host of the Food Network program Barefoot Contessa, and  a former staff member of the Office of Management and Budget.
Among her dishes are Perfect Roast Chicken, Weeknight Bolognese, French Apple Tart, and a simplified version of beef bourguignon. Her culinary career began with her gourmet food store, Barefoot Contessa; Garten then expanded her activities to many best-selling cookbooks, magazine columns, and a popular Food Network television show.

Early life
Born Ina Rosenberg to a Jewish family in the Brooklyn borough of New York City, and raised in Stamford, Connecticut,
Garten was one of two children born to Charles H. Rosenberg, a surgeon specializing in otolaryngology, and his wife, Florence (née Rich), a dietitian.  Encouraged to excel in school, she showed an aptitude for science and has said she uses her scientific mindset while experimenting with recipes. Garten's mother (an intellectual with an interest in opera) discouraged Ina from helping in the kitchen, instead directing her towards schoolwork. Garten described her father as a socializer, and admits she shares more characteristics with him than her mother.

At 15, she met her future husband Jeffrey Garten, on a trip to visit her brother at Dartmouth College.  After high school, she attended Syracuse University majoring in economics, and later went to George Washington University Graduate business school.

Career
On December 22, 1968, Jeffrey and Ina were married in Stamford and soon relocated to Fort Bragg, North Carolina. She began to dabble in cooking and entertaining in an effort to occupy her time; Jeffrey served a four-year military tour during the Vietnam War. She also acquired her pilot's certificate. 
After her husband had completed his military service, the couple went on a four-month camping vacation in Europe including time in France which sparked her love for French cuisine. During this trip, she was introduced to open-air markets, produce stands, and fresh cooking ingredients. Upon returning to the U.S., she began to cultivate her culinary abilities by studying the volumes of Simone Beck, Louisette Bertholle and Julia Child's influential cookbook, Mastering the Art of French Cooking.  During this time, weekly dinner parties turned to tradition, and she refined her home entertaining skills when she and her husband moved to Washington, D.C. in 1972.

In Washington, Garten worked in the White House; Jeffrey worked in the State Department, completing his PhD at Johns Hopkins School for Advanced International Studies. Garten was originally employed by the Federal Power Commission and later at the White House Office of Management and Budget. Eventually she was assigned the position of budget analyst, which entailed writing the nuclear energy budget and policy papers on nuclear centrifuge plants for presidents Gerald Ford and Jimmy Carter.

While she worked at OMB, Garten also taught herself to cook and entertain while buying and renovating old houses in the Dupont Circle and Kalorama neighborhoods. She used the profits from these sales to make her next purchase, the Barefoot Contessa specialty food store.

Barefoot Contessa store 
Garten left her government job in 1978 after spotting an ad for a  specialty food store called Barefoot Contessa in Westhampton Beach, New York.
"My job in Washington was intellectually exciting and stimulating but it wasn't me at all," she explained four years later.

After traveling to view it, she made a decision to purchase the store and moved to New York to assume ownership. The store had been named by its original owner in tribute to the 1954 film starring Ava Gardner. Garten kept the name when she took over; it meshed well with her idea of an "elegant but earthy" lifestyle. Ironically, as of 2006 she had not seen the film.

Three years later, Garten had moved Barefoot Contessa across Main Street to a larger property, and in 1985,she relocated the store to the newly vacated premises of gourmet shop Dean & DeLuca in the Long Island village of East Hampton. In contrast to Westhampton's seasonal beach atmosphere, East Hampton houses a year-round community, providing a larger customer base. In this new, larger space, the store specialized in delicacies such as lobster Cobb salad, caviar, imported cheeses, and locally grown produce.

Garten employed local chefs and bakers as the business grew, including Anna Pump (who later bought Loaves & Fishes Specialty Food Store and the Bridgehampton Inn). The shop was praised in the press by celebrity clientele such as Steven Spielberg.

In 1996, after two decades of operating Barefoot Contessa, Garten again found herself seeking a change; she sold the store to two employees, Amy Forst and Parker Hodges, but retained ownership of the building itself. Unsure of what career step to take after selling the store, she took a one year sabbatical from the culinary scene and built herself an office above the store. There, she studied the stock market and attempted to sketch out plans for potential business ventures. At this time, her website, Barefoot Contessa, became high-profile as she began offering her coffees and a few other items for purchase online.

By 2003, Barefoot Contessa had become a landmark gathering place for East Hampton; director Nancy Meyers even chose the store as one of the sets for the Jack Nicholson-Diane Keaton film Something's Gotta Give. The store was permanently closed in 2003 when the property lease expired and negotiations failed between Garten (still the owner of the building) and the new owners.  Garten did not reopen the shop but retained the property for potential new tenants.

Barefoot Contessa cookbooks 

In 1999, Garten reemerged with her attention turned to publishing. She carried on the Barefoot Contessa name in her 1999 sleeper bestseller, The Barefoot Contessa Cookbook. The book far exceeded both Garten’s and publisher Clarkson Potter’s expectations, containing the recipes that made her store successful. Garten eventually sold over 100,000 copies in the first year, immediately requiring second and third print runs after the initial printing of 25,000 cookbooks were sold. In 2001, she released Barefoot Contessa Parties!, Parties! also produced praise and high sales; Barefoot Contessa Family Style followed in 2002. The Barefoot Contessa Cookbook and Parties! were nominated for 2000 and 2002 James Beard Awards in the Entertaining & Special Occasion Cookbooks category. Parties! was a surprise entry—Garten was perceived as too inexperienced to compete with nominees such as French chef Jacques Pépin and international wine expert Brian St. Pierre.

With many color photographs, including a full-page picture facing each recipe, some critics argue that this method sacrifices space that could be used for recipes. Nevertheless, her cookbooks have received positive reviews; in 2005, fellow chef Giada De Laurentiis named Garten one of her favorite authors. , Garten has published thirteen cookbooks with more than 14 million copies in print.

The Physicians Committee for Responsible Medicine criticized Garten’s 2010 cookbook Barefoot Contessa: How Easy Is That? for its use of high-fat, high-calorie, and high-cholesterol meat and dairy ingredients, naming it one of “The Five Worst Cookbooks” of the year from a nutritional standpoint. In response, Eric Felten of The Wall Street Journal called the report “an assault on cookbooks that dare to venture beyond lentils.”

Barefoot Contessa on Food Network 

Garten established herself with her cookbooks and appearances on Martha Stewart’s show, and then moved into the forefront in 2002 with the debut of her Food Network program. After the success of The Barefoot Contessa Cookbook and Barefoot Contessa Parties!, Garten was approached by Food Network with an offer to host her own television cooking show. She rejected this proposal several times, until the London-based production company responsible for Nigella Bites was assigned to the deal. She acquiesced to a 13-show season, and Barefoot Contessa premiered in 2002 to a positive reception.

Her show features her husband and their friends and generally only hosts celebrities who are her friends. Barefoot Contessa has approximately one million viewers tuned in per episode and has posted some of Food Network’s highest ratings.

In 2005, the show was nominated for a Daytime Emmy Award in the category of Best Service Show. In 2009, the show and Garten were once again nominated for Daytime Emmy Awards in the categories of Best Culinary Program and Best Culinary Host, and Garten won her first Emmy in the latter category.

That same year, Garten announced that she had signed a three-year contract with Food Network to continue her cooking show, and will release two more cookbooks following Barefoot Contessa at Home. Garten was reportedly awarded the most lucrative contract for a culinary author to date, signing a multimillion-dollar deal for multiple books. She has also been approached several times to develop her own magazine, line of furniture, set of cookware, and chain of boutiques (reminiscent of Stewart’s Omnimedia), but has declined these offers, stating she has no interest in further complicating her life. In 2023, Barefoot Contessa, Go-To Dinners sold more than 800,00 copies and rose to number one on the New York Times bestseller list.

Barefoot Contessa Pantry 
In 2006, Garten launched her own line of packaged cake mixes, marinades, sauces, and preserves, branded as Barefoot Contessa Pantry, with her business partner Frank Newbold  and in conjunction with Stonewall Kitchen. These convenience foods were based on her most popular from-scratch recipes, such as coconut cupcakes, maple oatmeal scones, mango chutney, and lemon curd. Pricing of these items was comparatively expensive (for example, the suggested retail price for a single box of brownie mix is ten dollars), and were only sold through upscale cookware and gourmet shops such as Crate & Barrel, Sur La Table, and Chicago’s Fox & Obel Market Cafe.

Other Barefoot Contessa publications 
After critical acclaim and high sales of her first three cookbooks, she went on to write Barefoot in Paris and several columns for O, The Oprah Magazine. She also serves as the entertaining, cooking, and party planning consultant for the magazine. House Beautiful, a shelter magazine, featured a monthly Garten column entitled “Ask the Barefoot Contessa” until 2011. In this column, she gave cooking, entertaining, and lifestyle tips in response to letters from her readers. She launched a small line of note cards and journals to complement her books, and wrote the forewords for Kathleen King’s Tate’s Bake Shop Cookbook and Rori Trovato’s Dishing With Style. One of her recipes, ‘lemon roast chicken with croutons’, was featured in The Best American Recipes 2005–2006. Another of Garten’s dishes was selected for Today’s Kitchen Cookbook, a compilation of the most popular recipes featured on the daily news program The Today Show. For Thanksgiving 2010, her recipes were featured by Google on their homepage. In June 2012, she started a Facebook blog and three weeks later had over 100,000 followers. In 2019, she lent friend and author Sheryl Haft her recipe for potato latkes for the children’s book, Goodnight Bubbala.

Awards and honors
Garten was selected for the inaugural 2021 Forbes 50 Over 50; made up of entrepreneurs, leaders, scientists and creators who are over the age of 50.

Personal life 

Her husband Jeffrey Garten was Undersecretary of Commerce for International Trade in the Bill Clinton administration from 1993 to 1995, and Juan Trippe Professor in the Practice of International Trade, Finance, and Business at Yale. He was the dean of the Yale School of Management from 1995 to 2005. He can also frequently be seen on her cooking show, assisting his wife with simple tasks or sampling the dishes she has created. They divide their time among Manhattan, East Hampton, and Paris.

Garten served as hostess of the 16th Annual Hudson Peconic benefit for Planned Parenthood.
Registered in New York as a Democrat, Garten has contributed to the presidential campaign funds of George H. W. Bush, Bill Clinton, John Kerry, and Barack Obama.

Garten also sat on the Design Review Board for East Hampton, a panel that grants building permissions and approves architectural and design elements of the village. The board seeks to protect the historical district and further the overall aesthetics of the area.

Works

Books 
 The Barefoot Contessa Cookbook (1999), Clarkson Potter,  
 Barefoot Contessa Parties! Ideas and Recipes For Easy Parties That Are Really Fun (2001)
 Barefoot Contessa Family Style: Easy Ideas and Recipes That Make Everyone Feel Like Family (2002)
 Barefoot in Paris: Easy French Food You Can Make at Home (2004)
 Barefoot Contessa at Home: Everyday Recipes You'll Make Over and Over Again (2006)
 Barefoot Contessa Back to Basics: Fabulous Flavor from Simple Ingredients Clarkson Potter. 2008. .
 Barefoot Contessa: How Easy Is That? Clarkson Potter. 2010. .

Magazine columns 
 “Entertaining is Fun!” (Martha Stewart Living 1999–present)
 “Entertaining.” (O, The Oprah Magazine 2003–present)
 “Ask the Barefoot Contessa.” (House Beautiful 2006–present)

Television 
 From Martha’s Kitchen: Ina Garten’s Kitchen Clambake (2000)
 Barefoot Contessa (2002–present)
 Chefography (2006-2010)
 30 Rock (2010-2011)

Notes

References

External links 
 
 Barefoot Contessa official site
 Ask the Barefoot Contessa  in House Beautiful
 Ina Garten at the Chef and Restaurant Database
 Barefoot Contessa in the UK
 Biography on Encyclopedia.com

1948 births
20th-century American businesspeople
20th-century American businesswomen
20th-century American non-fiction writers
20th-century American women writers
21st-century American businesspeople
21st-century American businesswomen
21st-century American non-fiction writers
21st-century American women writers
American cookbook writers
American food industry businesspeople
American food writers
American television chefs
American women chefs
American women non-fiction writers
Businesspeople from Brooklyn
Carter administration personnel
Daytime Emmy Award winners
Food Network chefs
Ford administration personnel
George Washington University School of Business alumni
James Beard Foundation Award winners
Jewish American writers
Living people
New York (state) Democrats
People from Dupont Circle
People from East Hampton (town), New York
Syracuse University alumni
The New Yorker people
United States Office of Management and Budget officials
Women cookbook writers
Writers from Brooklyn
Writers from Stamford, Connecticut